The Senguerr River is a river of the Argentine province of Chubut. It begins its journey from the system of glacial lakes La Plata and Fontana in the Andes Mountains.

The river flows generally eastward, then circles around the southern end of the San Bernardo Mountains and then flows north-northeastward in several ramifications that end at the Musters Lake. On years of great precipitation, some arms of the river might reach the Colhué Huapi Lake, which has been greatly reduced in size in recent years.

See also
Río Senguer Department

References

Rivers of Argentina
Rivers of Chubut Province